The Eurasian collared dove (Streptopelia decaocto) is a dove species native to Europe and Asia; it was introduced to Japan, North America and islands in the Caribbean. Because of its vast global range and increasing population trend, it has been listed as Least Concern on the IUCN Red List since 2014.

Taxonomy 
Columba decaocto was the scientific name proposed by the Hungarian naturalist Imre Frivaldszky in 1838 who described a Eurasian collared dove. The type locality is Plovdiv in Bulgaria. It is now placed in genus Streptopelia that was introduced in 1855 by the French ornithologist Charles Lucien Bonaparte.

The Burmese collared dove (S. xanthocycla) was formerly considered a subspecies of the Eurasian collared dove, but was split as a distinct species by the IOC in 2021. Two other subspecies were formerly sometimes accepted, S. d. stoliczkae from Turkestan in central Asia and S. d. intercedens from southern India and Sri Lanka. They are now considered junior synonyms of the nominate subspecies (S. d. decaocto).

The Eurasian collared dove is closely related to the Sunda collared dove of Southeast Asia and the African collared dove of Sub-Saharan Africa, forming a superspecies with these. Identification from the African collared dove is very difficult with silent birds, with the African species being marginally smaller and paler, but the calls are very distinct, a soft purring in the African collared dove quite unlike the Eurasian collared dove's cooing.

Etymology 
The generic name is from the Ancient Greek streptos meaning "collar" and peleia meaning "dove";
the specific epithet is Greek for "eighteen". The number comes from a Greek myth. A maid who worked hard for little money was unhappy that she was only paid 18 coins a year and begged the gods to let the world know how little she was rewarded by her mistress. Thereupon Zeus created this dove that has called out "Deca-octo" ever since.

Description

It is grey-buff to pinkish-grey overall, a little darker above than below, with a blue-grey underwing patch. The tail feathers are grey-buff above, and dark grey and tipped white below; the outer tail feathers are also tipped whitish above. It has a black half-collar edged with white on its nape from which it gets its name. The short legs are red and the bill is black. The iris is red, but from a distance the eyes appear to be black, as the pupil is relatively large and only a narrow rim of reddish-brown iris can be seen around the black pupil. The eye is surrounded by a small area of bare skin, which is either white or yellow. The two sexes are virtually indistinguishable; juveniles differ in having a poorly developed collar, and a brown iris. The subspecies S. d. xanthocycla differs in having yellow rather than white eye-rings, darker grey on the head and the underparts a slightly darker pink.

The song is a goo-GOO-goo. The Eurasian collared dove also makes a harsh loud screeching call lasting about two seconds, particularly in flight just before landing. A rough way to describe the screeching sound is a hah-hah.

Eurasian collared doves cooing in early spring are sometimes mistakenly reported as the calls of early-arriving common cuckoos and, as such, a mistaken sign of spring's return.

Distribution and habitat

The Eurasian collared dove is not migratory, but is strongly dispersive. Over the last century, it has been one of the great colonisers of the bird world, travelling far beyond its native range to colonise colder countries, becoming a permanent resident in several of them. Its original range at the end of the 19th century was warm temperate and subtropical Asia from Turkey east to southern China and south through India to Sri Lanka. In 1838 it was reported in Bulgaria, but not until the 20th century did it expand across Europe, appearing in parts of the Balkans between 1900 and 1920, and then spreading rapidly northwest, reaching Germany in 1945, Great Britain by 1953 (breeding for the first time in 1956), Ireland in 1959, and the Faroe Islands in the early 1970s. Subsequent spread was 'sideways' from this fast northwestern spread, reaching northeast to north of the Arctic Circle in Norway and east to the Ural Mountains in Russia, and southwest to the Canary Islands and northern Africa from Morocco to Egypt, by the end of the 20th century. In the east of its range, it has also spread northeast to most of central and northern China, and locally (probably introduced) in Japan. It has also reached Iceland as a vagrant (41 records up to 2006), but has not colonised successfully there.

Invasive status in North America
In 1974, fewer than 50 Eurasian collared doves escaped captivity in Nassau, New Providence, Bahamas. From the Bahamas, the species spread to Florida, and is now found in nearly every state in the U.S. as well as in Mexico. In Arkansas (the United States), the species was recorded first in 1989 and since then has grown in numbers and is now present in 42 of 75 counties in the state. As of 2012, few negative impacts have been demonstrated in Florida, where the species is most prolific. However, the species is known as an aggressive competitor and there is concern that as populations continue to grow, native birds will be out-competed by the invaders. However, one study found that Eurasian collared doves are not more aggressive or competitive than native mourning doves, despite similar dietary preferences.

Population growth has ceased in areas where the species has long been established, such as Florida, and in these regions recent observations suggest the population is in decline. The population is still growing exponentially in areas of more recent introduction: up to 2015, the Eurasian collared dove experienced a greater than 1.5% yearly population increase throughout nearly the entirety of its North American range. Carrying capacities appear to be highest in areas with higher temperatures and intermediate levels of development, such as suburban areas and some agricultural areas.

While the spread of disease to native species has not been recorded in a study, Eurasian collared doves are known carriers of the parasite Trichomonas gallinae as well as pigeon paramyxovirus type 1. Both Trichomonas gallinae and pigeon paramyxovirus type 1 can spread to native birds via commingling at feeders and by consumption of doves by predators. Pigeon paramyxovirus type 1 is an emergent disease and has the potential to affect domestic poultry, making the Eurasian collared dove a threat to not only native biodiversity, but a possible economic threat as well.

Behaviour and ecology

Breeding
Eurasian collared doves typically breed close to human habitation wherever food resources are abundant and there are trees for nesting; almost all nests are within  of inhabited buildings. The female lays two white eggs in a stick nest, which she incubates during the night and which the male incubates during the day. Incubation lasts between 14 and 18 days, with the young fledging after 15 to 19 days. Breeding occurs throughout the year when abundant food is available, though only rarely in winter in areas with cold winters such as northeastern Europe. Three to four broods per year is common, although up to six broods in a year has been recorded. Eurasian collared doves are a monogamous species, and share parental duties when caring for young.

The male's mating display is a ritual flight, which, as with many other pigeons, consists of a rapid, near-vertical climb to height followed by a long glide downward in a circle, with the wings held below the body in an inverted "V" shape. At all other times, flight is typically direct using fast and clipped wing beats and without use of gliding.

Food and feeding
The Eurasian collared dove is not wary and often feeds very close to human habitation, including visiting bird tables; the largest populations are typically found around farms where spilt grain is frequent around grain stores or where livestock are fed. It is a gregarious species and sizeable winter flocks will form where there are food supplies such as grain (its main food) as well as seeds, shoots and insects. Flocks most commonly number between 10 and 50, but flocks of up to 10,000 have been recorded.

References

External links

 Ageing and sexing (PDF; 4.6 MB) by Javier Blasco-Zumeta & Gerd-Michael Heinze
 Eurasian Collared Dove: Breed Guide Pigeonpedia.com
 
 
 
 Xeno-Canto recordings of Eurasian Collared Dove

Eurasian collared dove
Birds of Eurasia
Eurasian collared dove
Taxa named by Imre Frivaldszky